Pretty Little Liars: Original Sin, known as Pretty Little Liars: Summer School for its second season, is an American slasher teen drama mystery streaming television series created by Roberto Aguirre-Sacasa and Lindsay Calhoon Bring for HBO Max. It is the fourth television series in the Pretty Little Liars franchise, which is based on the novel series written by Sara Shepard, and set within the same continuity as the previous series. The series features an ensemble cast, headed by Bailee Madison, Chandler Kinney, Zaria, Malia Pyles, and Maia Reficco.

Warner Bros. announced the series's development with Aguirre-Sacasa as showrunner in September 2020. It was given a straight-to-series order by HBO Max at the end of the same month. Filming took place in New York during the COVID-19 pandemic. It is the first series in the franchise not to be broadcast on ABC Family/Freeform and to be carried on a streaming television service.

Pretty Little Liars: Original Sin premiered on July 28, 2022. In September 2022, the series was renewed for a second season, retitled as Pretty Little Liars: Summer School.

Plot
The slasher series follows the lives of a group of teenage girls who live in Millwood, Pennsylvania, after receiving terrifying  and cryptic messages from a mysterious assailant named "A", holding them responsible for something tragic that their mothers did that resulted in the death of a classmate 22 years earlier. The girls are forced to team up to figure out what happened during the year of 1999 and what roles their mothers played that resulted in the tragedy.

Cast and characters

Main
 Bailee Madison as Imogen Adams, a resourceful pregnant teen
 Chandler Kinney as Tabby Haworthe, an aspiring filmmaker and horror film fanatic
 Zaria as Faran Bryant, a determined ballerina who deals with racism in the industry
 Malia Pyles as Minnie "Mouse" Honrada, an Internet-obsessed teen with a history of trauma
 Maia Reficco as Noa Olivar, a track star freshly out of juvie
 Mallory Bechtel as:
 Karen Beasley, the queen bee of Millwood High who recently had a falling out with Imogen
 Kelly Beasley, Karen's twin sister who often is outshined by her sister
 Sharon Leal as Sidney Haworthe, a real estate agent and Tabby's mother
 Kristen Maxwell as teen Sidney
 Elena Goode as Marjorie Olivar, a nurse and Noa's mother
 Sarah-Anne Martinez as teen Marjorie
 Eric Johnson as Sheriff Tom Beasley, the local sheriff and the domineering patriarch of the Beasley family
 Alex Aiono as Shawn Noble, a popular jock and Noa's supportive boyfriend
 Lea Salonga as Elodie Honrada, one of Mouse's mothers, who tries to keep her daughter safe
 Emily Bautista as teen Elodie
 Jordan Gonzalez as Ash Romero (season 2; recurring season 1), Mouse's love interest

Recurring

 Kate Jennings Grant as Madame Giry, the ballerina instructor at Millwood High
 Carly Pope as Davie Adams, Imogen's mother 
 Ava DeMary as teen Davie
 Robert Stanton as Marshall Clanton, the principal at Millwood High
 Jeffrey Bean as Mr. Smithee, the film teacher at Millwood High
 Ben Cook as Henry Nelson, a ballerino and Faran's love interest
 Lilla Crawford as Sandy, Karen's friend
 Jennifer Ferrin as Martha Beasley, Karen and Kelly's mother and Sheriff Beasley's wife
 Derek Klena as Wes, Tabby's boss at the theater who recently graduated from film school at NYU
 Elias Kacavas as Greg, Karen's boyfriend
 Carson Rowland as Chip Langsberry, Tabby's co-worker and best friend
 Gabriella Pizzolo as Angela Waters, a teenager from the mothers' past who killed herself at midnight during a rave to celebrate Y2K
 Kim Berrios Lin as Shirley, one of Mouse's mother
 Zakiya Young as Corey Bryant, Faran's mother who works at a law firm in Pittsburgh
 Kristian Mosley as teen Corey
Brian Altemus as Tyler Marchand, a student who recorded an exploitative video of Karen
 Benton Greene as Zeke Bryant, Faran's father
 Alexander Chaplin as Steve Bowers, a father who seeks comfort in Mouse after his daughter disappeared

Guest characters from Pretty Little Liars
 Charles Gray as Eddie Lamb, a former nurse at Radley Sanitarium who is now a maintenance manager at the Radley Hotel. Eddie was a recurring character in the first series, where he was originally played by Reggie Austin.

Episodes

Production

Development 
On September 2, 2020, it was announced that a new Pretty Little Liars series was in development at Warner Bros., with Riverdale creator Roberto Aguirre-Sacasa taking over as showrunner from I. Marlene King. Original Sin takes place within the same continuity as the previous television series, but follows new characters and storylines in a new setting.

On September 24, 2020, HBO Max gave the series a direct-to-series order of 10-episodes and was named Pretty Little Liars: Original Sin, with Aguirre-Sacasa teaming up with Lindsay Calhoon Bring to develop the series. Aguirre-Sacasa also executive produces the series alongside King, Leslie Morgenstein and Gina Girolamo. Production companies involved with the series are Muckle Man Productions, Alloy Entertainment, and Warner Bros. Television. 

On September 7, 2022, HBO Max renewed the series for a second season, retitled as Pretty Little Liars: Summer School.

Casting 
In July 2021, Chandler Kinney, Maia Reficco, and Bailee Madison were cast on starring roles. In August 2021, Zaria, Malia Pyles, Alex Aiono, Mallory Bechtel, and Eric Johnson joined the main cast. In September 2021, Carson Rowland, Jordan Gonzalez, Ben Cook, Elias Kacavas, Benton Greene, Lea Salonga, Sharon Leal, Carly Pope, Elena Goode, and Zakiya Young were cast in recurring roles. In November 2021, Cristala Carter, Derek Klena, Kate Jennings Grant, Robert Stanton, Jennifer Ferrin, Lilla Crawford, Brian Altemus, Anthony Ordonez, and Jeffrey Bean joined the cast in recurring capacities. In December 2021, Ava DeMary, Kristen Maxwell, and Gabriella Pizzolo were cast in recurring roles. In November 2022, Gonzalez was promoted as a series regular for the second season.

Filming 
The series was set to film at Upriver Studios in Saugerties, New York, in mid to late 2021. Filming began on August 23, 2021, in the city of Hudson, New York, during the COVID-19 pandemic. Filming wrapped on May 2, 2022.

Music 
Film composer Joseph Bishara was hired to do the series' score. He is known for his work in horror movies, including the Insidious film series and The Conjuring franchise. A remix version of "Secret" by the Pierces appeared in the opening sequence. The original song was previously used as the opening theme in the original Pretty Little Liars, while Pretty Little Liars: The Perfectionists used a cover version by Denmark + Winter.

Release 
The series premiered on July 28, 2022, with the first three episodes available, followed by two more episodes each on August 4 and 11, and then the final three episodes on August 18.

Reception 
Pretty Little Liars: Original Sin was met with a very positive response to critical acclaim from critics. The review aggregator website Rotten Tomatoes reported an 88% approval rating with an average rating of 6.9/10, based on 17 critical reviews. The website's critics consensus reads, "Boasting a tantalizing new mystery along with a refreshingly grounded crop of pretty little liars, Original Sin is a gossipy good time." Metacritic, which uses a weighted average, assigned a score of 82 out of 100 based on 5 critics, indicating "universal acclaim".

Notes

References

External links
 
 

Pretty Little Liars (franchise)
2022 American television series debuts
2020s American crime drama television series
2020s American high school television series
2020s American LGBT-related drama television series
2020s American horror television series
2020s American mystery television series
2020s American teen drama television series
American horror fiction television series
American sequel television series
American television spin-offs
American thriller television series
Crime thriller television series
English-language television shows
HBO Max original programming
Horror drama television series
Metafictional television series
Nonlinear narrative television series
Television series about teenagers
Television series about twins
Television series by Alloy Entertainment
Television series by Warner Bros. Television Studios
Television series created by Roberto Aguirre-Sacasa
Television series impacted by the COVID-19 pandemic
Television series set in the 1990s
Television series set in the 2000s
Television series set in the 2020s
Television shows based on American novels
Television shows filmed in New York (state)
Television shows set in Pennsylvania
Serial drama television series
Serial killers in television
Television series about revenge
Television series about bullying
Works about stalking
Teenage pregnancy in television
Transgender-related television shows
Murder in television
Suicide in television
Rape in television